The Island is a 2006 Russian film about a fictional 20th century Eastern Orthodox monk. The film closed the 2006 Venice Film Festival, proved to be a moderate box-office success and won both the Nika Award and the China TV Golden Eagle Award as the Best Russian film of 2006. The filming location was the city of Kem, in Karelia, on the shores of the White Sea. It received generally positive reviews from critics.

Plot 
During World War II, the sailor Anatoly and his captain, Tikhon, are captured by the Germans when they board their barge and tugboat, which is carrying a shipment of coal. The German officer leading the raid offers Anatolywho is terrified of dyingthe choice to be shot or to shoot Tikhon and stay alive, which Anatoly takes; he shoots, and Tikhon falls overboard. The Germans blow up the ship but Anatoly is found by Russian Orthodox monks on the shore the next morning. He survives and becomes a stoker at the monastery but is perpetually overcome with guilt.

Thirty years pass. Anatoly now has the gifts of prophecy and healing. But the other monks do not really understand him. People come to see Anatoly for cures and guidance, but even now, he remains in a perpetual state of repentance. He often gets in a boat and goes to an uninhabited island where he prays for mercy and forgiveness and for Tikhon's soul.

Many years pass, and an admiral of the North Fleet arrives at the monastery. He brings his daughter who is  possessed by a demon, but Anatoly exorcises it. The admiral turns out to be Tikhon. It is revealed that Anatoly only wounded him in the arm. Tikhon forgives Anatoly.

Anatoly announces his death by Wednesday; the monks provide a coffin.  Dressed in a white garment such as Jesus wore or as an Orthodox baptismal garment, he lies in the coffin, wearing a crucifix.  Monks, one carrying a large cross representing the risen Christ, are seen rowing the coffin away from the island.

Spiritual message 

The film is focused on father Anatoly's repentance of his sin (therefore the virtually continuous occurrence of the Jesus Prayer); but the transgressions of the depicted character (a fool for Christ) and their impact on the others are the means by which the actual plot develops. The film's director Pavel Lungin, speaking of the central character's self-awareness, said he doesn't regard him as being clever or spiritual, but blessed "in the sense that he is an exposed nerve, which connects to the pains of this world. His absolute power is a reaction to the pain of those people who come to it;" while "typically, when the miracle happens, the lay people asking for a miracle are always dissatisfied" because "the world does not tolerate domestic miracles."

Screenwriter Dmitry Sobolev further explains: "When a person asks God for something, he is often wrong because God has a better understanding of what a person needs at that moment." Pyotr Mamonov, who plays the lead character, formerly one of the few rock musicians in the USSR, converted to Eastern Orthodoxy in the 1990s and lived in an isolated village until his death in 2021. Pavel Lungin said about him that "to a large extent, he played himself." Mamonov received a blessing from his confessor for playing the character.

The former Patriarch of Moscow, Alexei II (who held the office from 1990-2008), praised Ostrov for its profound depiction of faith and monastic life, calling it a "vivid example of an effort to take a Christian approach to culture."

Cast 
 Pyotr Mamonov as father Anatoly
 Viktor Sukhorukov as father Filaret
 Dmitri Dyuzhev as father Iov (Job)
 Yuriy Kuznetsov as Tikhon
 Viktoriya Isakova as Nastya
 Nina Usatova as widow
 Jana Esipovich as young woman
 Olga Demidova as woman with child
 Timofei Tribuntzev as young Anatoly
 Aleksei Zelensky as young Tikhon
 Grisha Stepunov as child
 Sergei Burunov as adjutant

Crew 
 Writer: Dmitry Sobolev
 Director: Pavel Lungin
 Producers:
 Pavel Lungin — main producer
 Sergei Shumakov — main producer
 Olga Vasilieva — producer
 Stage-manager: Andrei Zhegalov
 Artistic Directors:
 Igor Kotsarev
 Alexander Tolkachev
 Composer: Vladimir Martynov
 Sound:
 Stefan Albine
 Vladimir Litrovnik
 Montage: Albina Antipenko
 Costumes: Ekaterina Dyminskaya

Critical reception 
On review aggregator website Rotten Tomatoes, the film holds an approval rating of 63% based on 19 reviews, and an average rating of 5.8/10. Derek Adams of Time Out described the film as "both heartfelt and ultimately optimistic" in a generally positive review. Wesley Morris, writing for The Boston Globe, gave the film 2 and a half stars, called the film "an aggravating combination of piousness, arty self-pity, and knowing silliness meant to speak to higher spiritual truths".

Awards 
 2006 — Best Film at the Moscow Premiere festival.
 2007 — Six awards at the fifth national Golden Eagle Awards - "Best film", "Best male support role" (Viktor Suhorukov), "Best male role" (Petr Mamonov), "Best director" (Pavel Lungin), "Best scenario" (Dmitry Sobolev), "Best operator work" (Andrei Zhegalov).
 2007 - Nika Awards for Best Picture, Best Director, Best Actor, Best Supporting Actor, etc.

See also
 Starets, the type of character portrayed in the film
 Jesus Prayer

References

External links 
 Official site 
 
 
 Ostrov - synopsis and two opinions: positive and negative 

2006 films
2006 drama films
Russian drama films
2000s Russian-language films
Films about Christianity
Films set in 1942
Films set in 1976
Films set in Russia
Films set in the Soviet Union
Films set on islands
Films shot in Russia
Films directed by Pavel Lungin
Films about Orthodoxy